Eudes III (1166 – July 6, 1218), commonly known in English as Odo III, was duke of Burgundy between 1192 and 1218. Odo was the eldest son of duke Hugh III and his first wife Alice, daughter of Matthias I, Duke of Lorraine.

Life
Odo did not follow his father's aggressive policies towards France and proved a worthy ally of king Philip II of France in his wars against John Lackland and the Holy Roman Emperor Otto IV of Germany. He fought bravely against the latter in the Battle of Bouvines, where he lost, according to contemporary chroniclers, two horses beneath him. According to William the Breton he was of the phlegmatic temperament.

Odo was also an important figure in the Crusade against the Cathars. When Philip II refused to get involved, the Odo stepped forward with the support of the local bishops and his vassals and organized the campaign of 1209 against the Cathar strongholds. Before leaving on crusade against the Cathars, Odo pledged the castle of Ile-d'Ouche and the village of Crimolois to the Knights Templar to assist them in the defense of the Catholic faith.

Marriages and issue
He married in 1194 Theresa of Portugal (1156–1218), the daughter of Afonso I of Portugal, and Matilda of Savoy. She was repudiated in 1195, having produced no children.

In 1199, he married Alice of Vergy (1182–1252), the daughter of Hugh, Seigneur de Vergy, by Gillette de Trainel. This marriage produced:
 Joan (1200–1223), married Raoul II of Lusignan (died 1250), Seigneur d'Issoudun and Count of Eu.
 Alice (1204–1266) married Robert I (died 1262) Count of Clermont and Dauphin of Auvergne
 Hugh IV (1213–1272), his successor in the duchy
Beatrice (born 1216), married Humbert III of Thoire (died 1279)

Ancestry

References

Sources

See also
Dukes of Burgundy family tree

1166 births
1218 deaths
House of Burgundy
Dukes of Burgundy
Christians of the Fifth Crusade
People of the Albigensian Crusade
13th-century peers of France